Craig yr Allt is a hill in South Wales, overlooking Caerphilly to the east and the villages of Nantgarw and Taff's Well to the west.

The Taff Ely Ridgeway Walk passes over the hill.

References

Mountains and hills of Rhondda Cynon Taf
Marilyns of Wales